"A Most Unusual Camera" is episode 46 of the American television anthology series The Twilight Zone, and was the tenth episode of the second season. It originally aired on December 16, 1960 on CBS, and was an episode written by the show's creator, Rod Serling. The episode starred Fred Clark and Jean Carson.

Opening narration

Plot
Two thieves, husband and wife Chester and Paula Diedrich, have just robbed an antique shop and returned to the hotel suite they are using as a hideout. Chester dismisses most of the items they have stolen as junk, but finds a strange old box camera among them. When he takes a picture of Paula, it generates a self-developing photo of her wearing a fur coat. After she finds one inside a stolen chest and puts it on, the pair realize that the camera's pictures show the immediate future of its subjects. Its next picture accurately predicts the arrival of Paula's brother Woodward, who had just escaped from prison.

A televised horse race gives Chester the idea to take a picture of the blank winners' board at the local track before each of the day's races are run, then place bets based on the pictures' results. After winning thousands of dollars, they celebrate in their suite, where a waiter named Pierre takes notice of their camera and translates its French inscription "dix à la propriétaire" as "ten to an owner". Once Chester ushers Pierre out, he determines that the trio have taken a total of eight pictures. As they struggle over the camera, arguing about how to use the final two, they accidentally take a picture that shows a terrified Paula. Chester and Woodward continue their fight, but fall out an open window to their deaths. Paula reacts as in the picture, but calms down once she realizes that she can now keep all the money for herself.

She snaps the tenth and final picture of the two bodies and prepares to leave, only to be interrupted by Pierre. Having learned of her status as a wanted criminal, he robs her and threatens to turn her in to the police if she calls them for help. Glancing at the picture, he remarks that it shows more than two bodies in the courtyard below. Paula rushes to the window to check, but trips on an electrical cord and falls out of it to her demise. Pierre counts the corpses in the picture, but notices that there are four instead of three. Shocked, he drops the camera and falls out the window as well.

Closing narration

See also
 List of The Twilight Zone (1959 TV series) episodes
 The Goosebumps children's novels, Say Cheese and Die and Say Cheese and Die–Again
 The Goosebumps HorrorLand novella Say Cheese–and Die Screaming
 "Killer Camera", a short story from Anthony Horowitz's Horowitz Horror
 "Treehouse of Horror XV's" "The Ned Zone"
 The film Time Lapse

References
DeVoe, Bill. (2008). Trivia from The Twilight Zone. Albany, GA: Bear Manor Media. 
Grams, Martin. (2008). The Twilight Zone: Unlocking the Door to a Television Classic. Churchville, MD: OTR Publishing.

External links
 

1960 American television episodes
The Twilight Zone (1959 TV series season 2) episodes
Television episodes written by Rod Serling